Arthonia vinosa is a species of lichen belonging to the family Arthoniaceae.

It has a cosmopolitan distribution.

References

Arthoniomycetes
Lichen species
Lichens described in 1856